East York can refer to:

East York, Pennsylvania, United States
East York, Ontario, Canada